Jawahar Navodaya Vidyalaya, Dakshin Dinajpur is a boarding, co-educational  school in Dakshin Dinajpur district of West Bengal in India. Navodaya Vidyalayas are funded by the Indian Ministry of Human Resources Development and administered  by Navodaya Vidyalaya Smiti, an autonomous body under the MHRD ministry.

History 
The school was founded in 2009 and is a part of Jawahar Navodaya Vidyalaya schools. This school is administered and monitored by Patna regional office of Navodaya Vidyalaya Smiti.

Affiliations 
JNV Balurghat is affiliated to Central Board of Secondary Education with affiliation number 2440017.

See also 

 List of JNV schools
 Jawahar Navodaya Vidyalaya, Uttar Dinajpur

References

External links 

 Official Website of JNV Blurghat

Boarding schools in West Bengal
High schools and secondary schools in West Bengal
Dakshin Dinajpur
Schools in Dakshin Dinajpur district
Educational institutions established in 2009
2009 establishments in West Bengal